Crag Farm Pit, Sudbourne is a  geological Site of Special Scientific Interest east of Sudbourne in Suffolk. It is a Geological Conservation Review site, and within the Suffolk Coast and Heaths Area of Outstanding Natural Beauty.

This site dates to the early Pliocene, around four million years ago. It is described by Natural England as an important geological site, which has the best exposure of sandwave facies of the Coralline Crag Formation. Fossils of many bryozoan species are present.

The site has been filled in and is now a field. It is on private land with no public access.

References

Sites of Special Scientific Interest in Suffolk
Geological Conservation Review sites